David Lee Hoffman is an American tea importer.  He also founded and directs The Last Resort, an ecology research center, and The Phoenix Collection, a personal tea collection.

History

Hoffman is a self-promoted 'tea guru' and was as a vocal importer and public promoter of Chinese teas to the West, particularly puer teas in the 1970s-1990s. He began importing puer teas from Nepal in the early 1970s, and eventually ventured into remote regions in China to seek out the fine, rare, and wild teas. He became known in China as "the American Pu-erh Tea King". He was the first western importer of several teas, such as the flowering ("blossoming") tea from China, and is the subject of filmmaker Les Blank and Gina Leibrecht's 2007 documentary All in This Tea. Hoffman sold his Silk Road Tea company in 2004 and now runs The Last Resort and The Phoenix Collection.

Hoffman developed his interest in teas during his early world travels. In the early 1960s, Hoffman met the Dalai Lama while living in Dharamshala, India. Several Tibetan monks later contributed to the construction and creation of Hoffman's eastern-inspired sustainable research center in Lagunitas, California, which he calls "The Last Resort".

The Last Resort

Hoffman lives and works at a complex of home and business buildings he dubbed "The Last Resort" in Lagunitas, California. The mission of The Last Resort is to improve sustainable methods for waste management, water reuse, and food security. Using his research into vermiculture (worm composting), Hoffman created "the worm palace," a system that converts all household waste to high grade fertilizer, as part of Hoffman's quest for a "super soil". Hoffman first presented the benefits of vermiculture to the International Symposium on Earth Worm Ecology in Columbus, Ohio in 1994. Hoffman has also installed a greywater system, a two-vault composting toilet using a simple design formerly approved by the state, and solar systems at The Last Resort.

The Last Resort is also known by Hoffman as a 'living history of architectural research', where for over the past 40 years he has directed the construction of over 25 eclectic structures that constitute the complex, using low-cost and recycled materials and building techniques he learned throughout his travels. "It is an important and significant example of east-west Folk Art" according to "sustainable architect" Sim Van der Ryn, who was appointed California State Architect by California Governor Jerry Brown, and is on the architecture faculty at the University of California Berkeley.

References

External links 
Official Website of THE LAST RESORT
In Hippie Holdout, a Fight Over Worms and Moats NY Times April 23, 2012
Tour The Epic Sustainable Home That California Is About To Demolish, Business Insider, July 23, 2012
David Hoffman's Lagunitas home a work of art or a dangerous eyesore? Marin Independent Journal, July 24, 2012
All in this Tea: Les Blanks' Return, Village Voice, June 24, 2008
The Imminent Destruction of Worm Palace
How the Law Caught Up With a Marin County Visionary

Living people
American architects
American ecologists
American educators
Businesspeople in tea
Year of birth missing (living people)